Parliamentary elections were held in Portugal on 6 March 1887. The result was a landslide victory for the Progressive Party, which won 113 seats.

Results

The results exclude the six seats won at national level and those from overseas territories.

References

Legislative elections in Portugal
Portugal
1887 in Portugal
March 1887 events